Yolanda is a female given name, of Greek origin, meaning "Violet". The form of the name in Greek is Iolanthe. In German and Dutch the name is spelled Jolanda, in Czech and Slovak Jolantha, in Polish Jolanta, in Italian, Portuguese and Romanian Iolanda. People with those names include:

 Yolanda of Flanders (1175–1219), ruler of the Latin Empire in Constantinople
 Yolanda of Vianden (1231–1283), 13th-century prioress of Marienthal, Luxembourg
 Yolanda (or Violant) of Hungary (1215–1253), Queen consort of James I of Aragon
 Yolanda of Hungary, daughter of Béla IV of Hungary
 Yolanda, an alias of Symbionese Liberation Army member Emily Harris
 Yolanda Adams (born 1961), American gospel singer
 Yolanda Andrade (born 1970), Mexican television personality
 Yolanda Bako (born 1946), activist against domestic violence
 YolanDa Brown (born 1982), British saxophonist
 Yolanda Bonnell, Canadian actress and playwright
 Yolanda Cabrera, Mexican artist
 Yolanda Caballero (born 1982), Colombian long-distance runner
 Yolanda Carenzo (1902–1968), Argentinian pianist
 Yolanda Casazza (1908–1995), American dancer of the Veloz and Yolanda ballroom dancing team
 Yolanda Chen (born 1961), Russian athlete
 Yolanda Foster, Dutch American television personality
 Yolanda Griffith (born 1970), American basketballer
 Yolanda Hamilton (footballer) (born 1987), Jamaican footballer
 Yolanda van Heezik, New Zealand professor of zoology
 Yolanda Henry (born 1964), American track and field athlete who specialized in the high jump
 Yolanda Jones (born 1984), Puerto Rican basketballer
 Yolanda King (1955–2007), oldest child of Martin Luther King Jr. and Coretta Scott King
 Yolanda Klug (born 1995/1996), missing German who disappeared in 2019
 Yolanda Kondonassis (born 1963), American classical harpist
 Yolanda Mero-Irion, pianist, opera and theatre impresario, and philanthropist
 Yolanda Mohalyi (1909–1978), Hungarian-born Brazilian painter and stained glass artist
 Yolanda Moore (born 1974), American basketballer and post-game radio analyst
 Yolanda Murphy (1925–2016),  cultural anthropologist, co-author of Women of the Forest
 Yolanda Ortíz (diver) (born 1978), Cuban diver
 Yolanda Panek (1974 – disappeared 1995), American female murder victim
 Yolanda Pantin (born 1954), Venezuelan poet and children's writer 
 Yolanda Quijano, Mexican painter and sculptor
 Yolanda Saldívar (born 1960), American convicted murderer
 Yolanda Soares, Portuguese singer and songwriter
 Yolanda Sonnabend (1935–2015), British theatre and ballet designer and painter
 Yolanda Tortolero (died 2021), Venezuelan politician
 Yolanda Toussieng (born 1949), makeup artist
Yolanda Ribas (born 1988), British Singer songwriter, visionary artist and Drum and Bass MC with Spanish and Irish Descent

Fictional 
 Yolanda (Black Lagoon)
 Yolanda Hamilton (The Young and the Restless)
 Yolanda Montez, DC Comics' Wildcat

See also
 Yolanda (disambiguation)

Feminine given names
Given names derived from plants or flowers